Michal Breznaník (born 16 December 1985) is a Slovak football midfielder who plays for TJ Baník Kalinovo.

Club career
Breznaník started his career playing in the youth teams of hometown club MFK Revúca, later FC Junior - Radvaň and was then transferred to ŽP Šport Podbrezová. In 2007, he joined Slovak side Slovan Bratislava. For the 2010–11 season, Slovan Bratislava loaned Breznaník to Slovan Liberec. After the season, Breznaník moved to Slovan Liberec permanently.  On 6 September 2012, Breznaník signed three-year contract with Russian side Amkar Perm. His contract in Russia was terminated early due to a shoulder injury, with the player eventually signing as a free agent for Sparta Prague in 2014. He took part in the 2014 Czech Supercup, scoring the third goal as a substitute as Sparta defeated Viktoria Plzeň 3–0. Breznaník signed on loan for former club Slovan Liberec in the spring of 2015, and joined Dukla Prague, also on loan, in the spring of 2016.

International career
Breznaník made his debut for the senior national team of his country on 29 February 2012 in the 2–1 away win over Turkey in a friendly match.

Honours
ŠK Slovan Bratislava
 Corgoň Liga champion: 2008–09
 Slovak Cup winner: 2009–10

FC Slovan Liberec
 Czech First League champion: 2011–12
 Czech Cup: 2014–15

AC Sparta Prague
 Czech Supercup: 2014

References

External links
 
 

1985 births
Living people
Slovak footballers
Association football midfielders
FK Železiarne Podbrezová players
ŠK Slovan Bratislava players
FC Slovan Liberec players
FC Amkar Perm players
AC Sparta Prague players
FK Dukla Prague players
Slovak Super Liga players
2. Liga (Slovakia) players
Czech First League players
Slovak expatriate footballers
Expatriate footballers in the Czech Republic
Expatriate footballers in Russia
Russian Premier League players
People from Revúca
Sportspeople from the Banská Bystrica Region
Slovakia international footballers